Bangladesh competed at the 1992 Summer Olympics in Barcelona, Spain.

Competitors
The following is the list of number of competitors in the Games.

Athletics

Men
Track events

Shooting

Women

Swimming

Men

References 

Nations at the 1992 Summer Olympics
1992
Olympics